Liaoningotitan (meaning "Liaoning giant") is a genus of titanosauriform sauropod from the Early Cretaceous (Barremian) Yixian Formation in Liaoning, China.

Description
Distinguishing features of Liaoningotitan include a ventral margin of the maxilla that is convex, an upper tooth row that is short and anteriorly positioned; an anterior extension of the jugal that nearly reaches the level of the anterior margin of the antorbital fenestra; a basally constricted quadrate wing of the pterygoid; imbricated upper teeth, with narrow spatulate crowns that are D-shaped in cross section, and no labial grooves or denticles; nine reduced and un-imbricated lower teeth; asymmetric lower tooth crowns which are elliptical-like in cross section, with lingual grooves and ridges and a lingually bulbous basal crown; a proximal expansion of the humerus that is about 54.9% the length of the humerus; and an ilium with a pointed preacetabular process.

Classification
Zhou et al. (2018) recover Liaoningotitan as a somphospondylan titanosauriform more derived than Euhelopus. In 2022, Mo et al. found Liaoningotitan to be an unstable taxon that may be closely related to Diamantinasaurus and Baotianmansaurus.

Paleoecology
Liaoningotitan is one of three titanosauriforms from the Yixian Formation of Liaoning, the others being Dongbeititan and Ruixinia. These forms co-existed with feathered dinosaurs in the Early Cretaceous lacustrine environment of present-day Liaoning.

References

Macronarians
Cretaceous dinosaurs of Asia
Fossil taxa described in 2018